Lisa Cholodenko (born June 5, 1964) is an American screenwriter and director. Cholodenko wrote and directed the films High Art (1998), Laurel Canyon (2002), and The Kids Are All Right (2010). She has also directed television, including the miniseries Olive Kitteridge (2014) and Unbelievable (2019). She has been nominated for an Academy Award and a Golden Globe and has won an Emmy and a DGA Award.

Early life and education
Cholodenko is from the San Fernando Valley, and grew up in a liberal Jewish family. Her paternal grandfather emigrated from Ukraine.

Cholodenko received a BA in anthropology and ethnic studies from San Francisco State University, where she was a teaching assistant for Angela Davis. In the early 1990s, she was an apprentice editor on John Singleton's Boyz n the Hood.  She also worked as an assistant editor on Beeban Kidron's Used People, Brett Leonard's The Lawnmower Man, and Gus Van Sant's To Die For. In 1997, Cholodenko received an MFA from Columbia University School of the Arts in screenwriting and directing. While at Columbia, Cholodenko wrote and directed a number of short films, including Souvenir (1994) and Dinner Party (1997), which won the British Film Institute's Channel 4 TX prize and aired on UK, French, and Swiss television.

Career

Film
While at Columbia, Cholodenko wrote and directed her feature film debut High Art. High Art won the Waldo Salt Screenwriting Award at the Sundance Film Festival as well as the National Society of Film Critics award for Ally Sheedy's performance. High Art premiered at Cannes Director's Fortnight and was distributed by October Films.

Her next film Laurel Canyon, starring Frances McDormand, Christian Bale, and Kate Beckinsale, premiered at Cannes Director's Fortnight. It was nominated for multiple Independent Spirit Awards and was distributed by Sony Pictures Classics.

Cholodenko directed the 2004 film Cavedweller for Showtime; it earned Independent Spirit Award nominations for cast members Kyra Sedgwick and Aidan Quinn.

Cholodenko next co-wrote and directed The Kids Are All Right. She was nominated for an Academy Award for Best Original Screenplay. The film was nominated for another 3 Academy Awards, including Best Picture, and won a Golden Globe for Best Picture, Comedy or Musical. Filmed in 23 days, Cholodenko directed the film on a $3.5 million budget, a much smaller amount than her fellow 2011 Oscar nominees. The film was made with three different sources of equity financing, with Focus Features picking up the film for distribution.

Television
In 2014, Cholodenko directed the HBO four-part mini-series Olive Kitteridge starring Frances McDormand and Richard Jenkins. Olive Kitteridge is based on the novel of the same name by Elizabeth Strout. Bill Murray, Jesse Plemons, Zoe Kazan, and John Gallagher Jr. co-starred. Olive Kitteridge premiered at the 2014 Venice Film Festival to overwhelmingly positive reviews. The show received widespread critical acclaim when it premiered on television in November. It received three Golden Globe nominations, and Cholodenko received a Directors Guild Award and a Primetime Emmy Award for Outstanding Directing for her work on the miniseries.

In 2018 Cholodenko was an executive producer and directed the first three episodes of Netflix's limited series Unbelievable. Based on the 2015 news article "An Unbelievable Story of Rape" written by Christian Miller and Ken Armstrong the show received universal acclaim when it premiered in October 2019.  It received three Golden Globe nominations, three Emmy nominations, and won the Peabody Award.

Cholodenko has also directed episodes of Homicide: Life on the Street, Six Feet Under, The L Word, Hung, and Here and Now. Cholodenko was an executive producer, and directed the first episode, of the 2015 eight-part NBC miniseries The Slap, which was based on the Australian miniseries of the same name.

Cholodenko is set to direct and executive produce the first two episodes of the upcoming Hulu series The Girl from Plainville, starring Elle Fanning.

Personal life
Cholodenko has a son with musician Wendy Melvoin.

Filmography

Film

Television

Awards and nominations 
 1998: Sundance Film Festival, Waldo Salt Screenwriting Award for High Art
 1998: Sundance Film Festival, Grand Jury Prize (nominee) for High Art
 1999: Independent Spirit Awards, Best First Screenplay (winner) for High Art
 1999: Independent Spirit Awards, Best First Feature (nominee) for High Art – with Dolly Hall (producer), Jeffrey Kusama-Hinte (producer), Susan A. Stover (producer)
 2002: CICAE, CICAE Art Cinema Award (nominee) for Laurel Canyon
 2010: Humanitas Prize (nominee) for The Kids Are All Right – with Stuart Blumberg
 2010: New York Film Critics Circle, Best Screenplay for The Kids Are All Right – with Stuart Blumberg
 2010: Women in Film, Dorothy Arzner Directors Award
 2010: Women Film Critics Circle Awards, Best Woman Storyteller for The Kids Are All Right
 2011: Academy Award for Best Original Screenplay (nominee) for The Kids Are All Right – with Stuart Blumberg
 2011: BAFTA Award for Best Original Screenplay (nominee) for The Kids Are All Right – with Stuart Blumberg
 2011: Golden Globe Award for Best Screenplay (nominee) for The Kids Are All Right – with Stuart Blumberg
 2011: Golden Globe Award for Best Motion Picture – Musical or Comedy (winner) for The Kids Are All Right
 2011: Independent Spirit Awards, Best Director (nominee) for The Kids Are All Right
 2011: Independent Spirit Awards, Best Screenplay for The Kids Are All Right – with Stuart Blumberg
 2011: Writers Guild of America, Best Original Screenplay (nominee) for The Kids Are All Right – with Stuart Blumberg
 2014: Primetime Emmy Award for Outstanding Directing for a Limited Series, Movie, or Dramatic Special for Olive Kitteridge
 2014: Venice Film Festival, Silver Mouse for Olive Kitteridge
 2015: Directors Guild of America Award for Outstanding Directing – Miniseries or TV Film for Olive Kitteridge

See also
 List of female film and television directors
 List of lesbian filmmakers
 List of LGBT-related films directed by women

References

External links

1964 births
20th-century American screenwriters
20th-century American women writers
21st-century American screenwriters
21st-century American women writers
American people of Ukrainian-Jewish descent
American women film directors
American women screenwriters
Columbia University School of the Arts alumni
Directors Guild of America Award winners
Film directors from Los Angeles
Independent Spirit Award winners
Lesbian Jews
LGBT film directors
LGBT people from California
American LGBT screenwriters
American lesbian artists
American lesbian writers
Living people
Primetime Emmy Award winners
San Francisco State University alumni
Screenwriters from California
Writers from Los Angeles